Pelargonium album is a species of flowering plant of the genus Pelargonium. This species is native to South Africa. It is an apple/mint scented pelargonium which is very closely related to Pelargonium odoratissimum. It is in the subgenus reniforme along with Pelargonium sidoides and P. exstipulatum.

Etymology
Pelargonium comes from the Greek; Pelargos which means stork. Another name for pelargoniums is storksbills due to the shape of their fruit. Album refers to the white flowers.

Description
Pelargonium album is a small, semi-succulent plant that grows in slightly shaded areas in the Pilgrim's Rest area of South Africa.

References

album